White Mill, White Mills and White's Mill may refer to:

United Kingdom

Windmills
White Mill, Bethersden, a windmill in Kent
White Mill, Corpusty, a windmill in Norfolk
White Mill, Croydon, a windmill in Surrey
White Mill, East Bergholt, a windmill in Suffolk
White Mill, Eastbourne, a windmill in East Sussex
White Mill, Epworth, a windmill in Lincolnshire
White Mill, Felpham, a windmill in West Sussex
White Mill, Fontwell, a windmill in West Sussex
White Mill, Forncett St Peter, a windmill in Norfolk
White Mill, Headcorn, a windmill in Kent
White Mill, Lyminge, a windmill in Kent
White Mill, Ore, a windmill in East Sussex
White Mill, Sandwich, a windmill in Kent
White Mill, Southwold, a windmill in Suffolk
White Mill, Stone Cross, a windmill in East Sussex
White Mill, Southsea, a windmill in Hampshire
White Mill, Westfield, a windmill in East Sussex
White Cross Mill, York, a windmill in the North Riding of Yorkshire
White Top Mill, Mildenhall, a windmill in Suffolk

Watermills
White Mill, Sturminster Marshall, a mill near Sturminster Marshall on the River Stour, owned by the National Trust
White Mill, Sturry, a watermill on the River Stour, Kent

United States
White Mills, Kentucky
White Mill (White Mills, Kentucky), listed on the NRHP in Kentucky
White Mills, Pennsylvania
Old White Mill (Meshoppen, Pennsylvania), listed on the NRHP in Pennsylvania
White's Mill (Maryville, Tennessee), listed on the National Register of Historic Places in Blount County, Tennessee
White's Mill (Abingdon, Virginia), listed on the National Register of Historic Places in Washington County, Virginia
White's Mill (Casa Blanca, Arizona) the trading post and flour mill of Ammi M. White in the Pima Villages at Casa Blanca, Arizona, during the American Civil War.

Other
White Mills Distillery Company, Louisville, Kentucky, listed on the NRHP in Kentucky
Whitemill, County Louth, Éire

See also
Moulin Blanc (disambiguation)
Witte Molen (disambiguation)